In mathematics, rigidity of K-theory encompasses results relating algebraic K-theory of different rings.

Suslin rigidity
Suslin rigidity, named after Andrei Suslin, refers to the invariance of mod-n algebraic K-theory under the base change between two algebraically closed fields:  showed that for an extension 

of algebraically closed fields, and an algebraic variety X / F, there is an isomorphism

This result has stimulated various other papers. For example  show that the base change functor for the mod-n stable A1-homotopy category

is fully faithful.

Gabber rigidity
Another type of rigidity relates the mod-n K-theory of an henselian ring A to the one of its residue field A/m. This rigidity result is referred to as Gabber rigidity, in view of the work of  who showed that there is an isomorphism

provided that n≥1 is an integer which is invertible in A. 

If n is not invertible in A, the result as above still holds, provided that K-theory is replaced by the fiber of the trace map between K-theory and topological cyclic homology.

Applications
 used Gabber's and Suslin's rigidity result to reprove Quillen's computation of K-theory of finite fields.

References

 

 
 
 
	
 

 

 

Algebraic K-theory